The current decorations and medals of the Sri Lanka Police were adapted from those of the Dominion of Ceylon in 1972 when Sri Lanka became a republic.

Gallantry medals

 Janadhipathi Police Weeratha Padakkama (Presidential Medal of Police Gallantry)
 Sri Lanka Police Weeratha Padakkama (Sri Lanka Police Gallantry Medal)

Service medals

 Sri Lanka Police Vishishta Seva Padakkama (Sri Lanka Police Distinguished Service Medal)
 Sri Lanka Police Long Service Medal
 Sri Lanka Police First Aid Medal

Meritorious awards & medals

 Uththama Pooja Pranama Padakkama (Recognition of Meritorious Sacrifice Medal)
 Desha Putra Padakkama (Son of the Nation Medal)

Campaign medals 

 Purna Bhumi Padakkama
 Riviresa Campaign Services Medal
 Northern Humanitarian Operations Medal
 Eastern Humanitarian Operations Medal

Coronation / Inauguration medals

 Ceylon Police Independence Medal - 1948
 Queen Elizabeth II Coronation Medal - 1953
 President's Inauguration Medal - 1978

Anniversary medals

 Janaraja Padakkama (The Republic Medal) - 1972
 50th Independence Anniversary Commemoration Medal - 1998
 Sri Lanka Police 125th Anniversary Medal (125th Anniversary Medal)

United Nations' service medals

The United Nations Medal for participation in:
 United Nations Mission of Support to East Timor, in 2003
 United Nations Mission in Liberia, in 2007.

Former decorations & medals

Queen's Police Medal (1954-1977)
King's Police Medal (1909-1954)
Ceylon Police Medal (1950-1972)
Colonial Police Medal (1938-1950)
Ceylon Police Long Service Medal (1950-1972)
Colonial Police Long Service Medal (1934-1950) 
Defence Medal (1939-1945)

Order of precedence

See also

Military awards and decorations of Sri Lanka

References

External links

 Sri Lanka Police
 Police Medals

Civil awards and decorations of Sri Lanka
Law enforcement awards and honors
Law enforcement in Sri Lanka
Sri Lanka and the Commonwealth of Nations
Sri Lanka Police